Lever is a surname. Notable people with the surname include: 

Sir Arthur Lever, 1st Baronet (1860–1924), British politician
Arthur Lever (footballer) (1920–2004), Welsh professional footballer and Wales international
Asbury Francis Lever (1875–1940), member of the United States House of Representatives from South Carolina
Sir Ashton Lever (1729–1788), English collector of natural objects
Caitlin Lever (born 1985), Canadian softball player
Charles Lever (1806–1872), Irish novelist of English descent
Colin Lever (born 1939), English former cricketer
Darcy Lever (c.1759–1839), British author and expert in seamanship
Don Lever (born 1952), Canadian retired professional ice hockey left winger 
Eddie Lever, manager of English football club Portsmouth F.C. 1952–1958
Lafayette "Fat" Lever (born 1960), American retired professional basketball player
Sir Hardman Lever, 1st Baronet (1869–1947), English accountant and civil servant
Harold Lever, Baron Lever of Manchester (1914–1995), English barrister and politician
Harry Lever (born 1886), Australian rules footballer who played with St Kilda in the VFL
Hayley Lever (1876–1958), Australian-American painter, etcher, lecturer and art teacher
Henry W. Lever (1883–1980), American sportsperson and educator, head football coach at Carroll College
Jake Lever (born 1996), player for the Melbourne Demons in the Australian Football League
James Darcy Lever (1854–1910), English co-founder of Lever Brothers
Janet Lever, American professor of sociology
John Orrell Lever (1824–1897), English shipping owner and politician
John Lever (born 1949), English former cricketer
Johnny Lever (born 1957), Indian film actor and comedian
Laurie Lever (born 1947), English-Australian Olympic-level equestrian rider
Leslie Lever, Baron Lever (1905–1977), British politician
Mark Lever (born 1970), English former professional footballer
Sir Paul Lever (born 1944), British retired ambassador
Peter Lever (born 1940), English former cricketer
Philip Lever, 3rd Viscount Leverhulme (1915–2000), British landowner and race-horse owner
Rob Lever, English rugby league footballer
Steven Lever (born 1963), Founder of Levertech Engineering Services Ltd
Thomas Lever (or Leaver, Leiver) (1521–1577), English Protestant reformer and Marian exile
Tim Lever, member of British pop group Dead or Alive 1983–89
William Lever, 1st Viscount Leverhulme (1851–1925), English industrialist, philanthropist and politician; the primary founder of Lever Brothers
William Lever, 2nd Viscount Leverhulme (1888–1949), English industrialist and philanthropist
Yves Lever (1942–2020), Canadian film critic and historian

See also
Laver (surname)
Leaver